The United States Navy Unmanned Combat Air System Demonstrator (UCAS-D) program consists of
 Northrop Grumman X-47A Pegasus
 Northrop Grumman X-47B

The UCAS-D program is to demonstrate the feasibility of operating an unmanned vehicle on an aircraft carrier.  Technology and operational procedures gained from the program and X-47B demonstrator will be used to develop an operational unmanned carrier aircraft through the Unmanned Carrier-Launched Surveillance and Strike (UCLASS) program.

References

See also
 UCLASS

Unmanned aerial vehicles of the United States